The Benin tree hyrax (Dendrohyrax interfluvialis) is a species of tree hyrax within the family Procaviidae. It can be distinguished from neighboring Dendrohyrax dorsalis by its nighttime barking vocalizations, its shorter and broader skull, and its lighter pelage. Its range is the region between the Niger and Volta Rivers in West Africa, hence the specific epithet.

References

Hyraxes
Mammals of West Africa
Mammals described in 2021